Damian Humbley (born 13 February 1979) is an Australian singer and actor. Born in Queensland, he trained at the Western Australian Academy of Performing Arts. He is best known for his work on the stage in the UK, notable credits including acclaimed productions of Stephen Sondheim musicals such as Company at the Sheffield Crucible and Merrily We Roll Along at the Menier Chocolate Factory.

In 2013 he played the role of Charley Kringas in the Harold Pinter Theatre's filmed production of Merrily We Roll Along.

References

Male actors from Queensland
1979 births
Living people
21st-century Australian singers
21st-century Australian male singers